This is a list of Australian Statutory Instruments from 1905.

1905 Commonwealth Of Australia Numbered Acts 
 Supply Act (no 1) 1905-6 (no. 1, 1905)
 Jury Exemption Act 1905 (no. 2, 1905)
 Supply Act (no 2) 1905-6 (no. 3, 1905)
 Evidence Act 1905 (no. 4, 1905)
 Service And Execution Of Process Incorporation Act 1905 (no. 5, 1905)
 Appropriation (works And Buildings) Act 1905-6 (no. 6, 1905)
 Supply Act (no 3) 1905-6 (no. 7, 1905)
 Wireless Telegraphy Act 1905 (no. 8, 1905)
 Papua Act 1905 (no. 9, 1905)
 Secret Commissions Act 1905 (no. 10, 1905)
 Representation Act 1905 (no. 11, 1905)
 The Life Assurance Companies Act 1905 (no. 12, 1905)
 Amendments Incorporation Act 1905 (no. 13, 1905)
 Appropriation Act 1905-6 (no. 14, 1905)
 Census And Statistics Act 1905 (no. 15, 1905)
 Commerce (trade Descriptions) Act 1905 (no. 16, 1905)
 Immigration Restriction Amendment Act 1905 (no. 17, 1905)
 Queen Victoria Memorial Act 1905 (no. 18, 1905)
 The Contract Immigrants Act 1905 (no. 19, 1905)
 Trade Marks Act 1905 (no. 20, 1905)
 Supplementary Appropriation Act 1903-4 And 1904-5 (no. 21, 1905)
 Supplementary Appropriation (works And Buildings) Act 1903-4 And 1904-5 (no. 22, 1905)
 Sugar Bounty Act 1905 (no. 23, 1905)
 Excise Tariff 1905 (no. 24, 1905)
 Copyright Act 1905 (no. 25, 1905)
 Commonwealth Electoral Act 1905 (no. 26, 1905)

See also  
 List of Acts of the Parliament of Australia
 List of Statutory Instruments of Australia

External links 
 1905 Commonwealth of Australia Numbered Act http://www.austlii.edu.au/au/legis/cth/num_act/1905/
 COMLAW Historical Acts http://www.comlaw.gov.au/Browse/ByTitle/Acts/Historical
 COMLAW Select Statutory Instruments http://www.comlaw.gov.au/Browse/ByYearNumber/SelectLIsandStatRules/Asmade/0/

Lists of the Statutory Instruments of Australia
Statutory Instruments